The women's singles tournament of the 2022 BWF World Championships took place from 22 to 28 August 2022 at the Tokyo Metropolitan Gymnasium in Tokyo.

Seeds

The seeding list was based on the World Rankings of 9 August 2022.

  Akane Yamaguchi (champion)
  Tai Tzu-ying (semi-finals)
  An Se-young (semi-finals)
  Chen Yufei (final)
  Carolina Marín (quarter-finals)
  Nozomi Okuhara (withdrew)
  P. V. Sindhu (withdrew)
  Ratchanok Intanon (third round)

  He Bingjiao (third round)
  Pornpawee Chochuwong (third round)
  Wang Zhiyi (third round)
  Busanan Ongbamrungphan (quarter-finals)
  Michelle Li (quarter-finals)
  Sayaka Takahashi (third round)
  Mia Blichfeldt (second round)
  Beiwen Zhang (third round)

Draw

Finals

Top half

Section 1

Section 2

Bottom half

Section 3

Section 4

References 

2022 BWF World Championships
Badminton World Federation